Meggers may refer to:

Astronomy
Meggers (crater), impact crater that lies on the far side of the moon

People with the surname
Betty Meggers (1921–2012), American archaeologist
George W. Meggers (1888–1969), American politician
William Frederick Meggers (1888–1966), American physicist specialising in spectroscopy

Places
Meggers, Wisconsin, unincorporated community